Berndt-Otto Rehbinder (1 May 1918 – 12 December 1974) was a Swedish fencer. He won a silver medal in the team épée event at the 1952 Summer Olympics.

References

External links
 

1918 births
1974 deaths
20th-century Swedish people
Swedish male épée fencers
Olympic fencers of Sweden
Fencers at the 1952 Summer Olympics
Fencers at the 1956 Summer Olympics
Fencers at the 1960 Summer Olympics
Olympic silver medalists for Sweden
Olympic medalists in fencing
People from Karlskrona
Medalists at the 1952 Summer Olympics
Sportspeople from Blekinge County

Berndt-Otto